Please Mr. Jackson is the debut album by saxophonist Willis Jackson. It featured organist Jack McDuff and guitarist Bill Jennings, and was recorded and released 1959 on the Prestige label.

Reception

AllMusic reviewer Scott Yanow stated: "In 1959, starting with this Prestige set Jackson made his mark on soul-jazz."

Track listing 
All compositions by Willis Jackson, Bill Jennings and Jack McDuff' except where indicated.
 "Cool Grits" – 8:32  
 "Come Back to Sorrento" (Ernesto De Curtis) – 4:30  
 "Dinky's Mood" (Jackson, McDuff) – 3:55  
 "Please Mr. Jackson" – 5:44  
 "633 Knock" (Jennings) – 5:18  
 "Memories of You" (Eubie Blake, Andy Razaf) – 6:03

Personnel 
Willis Jackson – tenor saxophone
Jack McDuff – organ
Bill Jennings – guitar
Tommy Potter – bass
Alvin Johnson – drums

References 

1959 debut albums
Willis Jackson (saxophonist) albums
Prestige Records albums
Albums recorded at Van Gelder Studio
Albums produced by Esmond Edwards